Blink-182 in Concert  (also known as The Summer Tour and the Greatest Hits Tour) was the tenth concert tour by American rock band Blink-182 and was the band's first tour since 2004. Bassist/singer Mark Hoppus jokingly referred to the tour  as One Way Ticket to Boneville, a name they got from a fan on a KROQ interview. In 2009, it ranked 32nd on Pollstar's "Top 50 Tours in North America", earning over $25 million.

Background

After tensions among the band members arose in 2004, plans for a spring 2005 tour in North America were scrapped. In early 2005, a confirmed appearance at the Music for Relief benefit concert to be held in Anaheim, California, U.S. was cancelled. On February 22, 2005, guitarist/vocalist Tom DeLonge announced he had quit the band.

The members went their separate ways. DeLonge formed a new band, Angels & Airwaves, which released two albums and a DVD, entitled Start the Machine, chronicling the final days of Blink-182 and the genesis of Angels & Airwaves. Hoppus and Barker formed a new project +44, which released one album in 2006. The new +44 album was still in pre-production.

At the 51st Grammy Awards ceremony on February 8, 2009, all three members of the band appeared onstage for the first time since December 2004. Barker announced the band's reformation, stating that "we used to play music together, and we decided we're going to play music together again", with Hoppus adding, "Blink-182 is back!" A message appearing on the band's website the same day confirmed the reformation and added that the band was in the studio writing and recording a new album and preparing for a world tour. The band also updated their "smiley face" logo to feature six arrows instead of the previous five. After the on-stage announcement many fans began to speculate on Travis Barker's arm being in a sling. An MTV article released on February 10 claimed that Barker had recently undergone surgery to repair "extensive nerve damage", from which a recovery could take up to ten weeks. This would not affect the tour, which started in the summer of 2009.

On February 16, DeLonge confirmed that Blink-182 would be touring in "a big event" this summer. DeLonge went on to note that his commitments with Angels & Airwaves would be held off and the band would release a new album coupled with a feature film in 2010. DeLonge stated that the new Blink-182 record would be a fusion of all his previous works, including Box Car Racer and Angels & Airwaves.

As a surprise to fans, the band played their first live performance since 2004 at the T-Mobile launch for the new Sidekick at the Paramount Pictures lot in Hollywood, California on May 14, 2009. In addition to the performance, the band made their first television appearance since the 2005 break up; they played "The Rock Show" on May 18 and also performed "All the Small Things" on May 19, both on The Tonight Show with Jay Leno. Fall Out Boy was the main supporting act for the tour and played their last concert together in New York City on October 4, before reuniting in 2013. Weezer took over the last 4 dates of the North American tour .

Opening acts

The All-American Rejects (North America, select dates)
Asher Roth (North America, select dates)
Chester French (North America, select dates)
Fall Out Boy (North America, select dates)
Panic! at the Disco (North America, select dates)
Taking Back Sunday (North America, select dates)
Weezer (North America, select dates)
Motion City Soundtrack (Las Vegas)
Bobby Light (Las Vegas—July 23)

Valencia (Las Vegas—July 23, Charlotte, Atlanta)
The Planet Smashers (Montreal)
illScarlett (Toronto—August 8)
The Academy Is... (Maryland Heights)
The Aquabats (Los Angeles, Santa Barbara)
Mickey Avalon (Los Angeles)
Twin Atlantic (Aberdeen, Glasgow and Dublin)
All Time Low (Hamburg)
Thrice (Hamburg)

Setlist
"Dumpweed"
"Feeling This"
"The Rock Show"
"Easy Target" or "Go"
"What's My Age Again?"
"Obvious" or "Violence"
"I Miss You"
"Stay Together for the Kids"
"Down"
"Always"
"Stockholm Syndrome"
"First Date"
"Man Overboard"
"Going Away to College" or "Don't Leave Me"
"Not Now"
"All the Small Things"
"Adam's Song" (July 23–August 27)
"Reckless Abandon"
"Josie"
"Anthem Part Two"
Encore
"Untitled I" (Instrumental Interlude)
"Carousel"
"Dammit"
Source:

Tour dates

Festivals and other miscellaneous performances

This concert was a part of the "Virgin Mobile FREEFEST"
This concert was a part of "The Buzz Beach Ball"
This concert was a part of "Pukkelpop"
This concert was a part of "Lowlands"
This concert was a part of the "Area4 Festival"
This concert was a part of the "Highfield-Festival"
This concert was a part of "Chiemsee Rocks"

This concert was a part of "Rock en Seine"
This concert was a part of the "Leeds Festival"
This concert was a part of the "Reading Festival"
This concert was a part of "Two Days a Week"
This concert was a part of "Independent Days Festival"
This concert was a part of "Epicenter"

Cancellations and rescheduled shows

Box office box score

Personnel
 Mark Hoppus – bass and vocals
 Tom DeLonge – guitar and vocals
 Travis Barker – drums, percussion

External links
Blink-182 Official Website

References

2009 concert tours
2010 concert tours
Blink-182 concert tours
Reunion concert tours